Liu Fangwu (17 April 1898 – 29 June 1994) was a Chinese Nationalist (KMT) general, a graduate of Whampoa Military Academy, best known for his leadership in the Battle of Yenangyaung.

Biography
Liu was born Liu Jishu in Renyi Town of Guiyang County, Hunan, on April 17, 1898. He attended the Lanjia Joint Middle School (now Guiyang No. 1 High School). After graduating from Whampoa Military Academy, he enlisted in the National Revolutionary Army. In July 1942, he participated in the Battle of Yenangyaung led by Sun Li-jen in Burma, rescuing more than 7000 British soldiers and 500 American journalists and missionaries.

After the Chinese Civil War, he moved to Taiwan with his family. Liu retired in January 1954 and emigrated to Los Angeles in 1977.

In 1992, the former British Prime Minister Margaret Thatcher met with him and thanked him for saving the British army. On July 27, 1992, former US President George W. Bush wrote a thank-you letter to him.

Liu died of illness on June 29, 1994, in Los Angeles.

Personal life
Liu married Liu Zhenru, their son, Liu Weimin, is a Chinese-American entrepreneur.

Television
It is said that the character Long Wenzhang of My Chief and My Regiment is based on the real-life of Liu Fangwu.

References

Further reading
 

1898 births
1994 deaths
People from Chenzhou
Whampoa Military Academy alumni
Military personnel of the Republic of China in the Second Sino-Japanese War
National Revolutionary Army generals from Hunan
Chinese military personnel of World War II
People of the Chinese Civil War